Badlapur (stylized बदलाPUR) is a 2015 Indian Hindi-language neo-noir dark revenge film directed by Sriram Raghavan and produced by Dinesh Vijan and Sunil Lulla under Maddock Films and Eros International. Based on the novel Death's Dark Abyss by Italian writer Massimo Carlotto, the film stars Varun Dhawan and Nawazuddin Siddiqui, with Huma Qureshi, Yami Gautam, Vinay Pathak, Kumud Mishra, Divya Dutta and Radhika Apte in supporting roles. 
The film was released on 20 February 2015 to high critical acclaim from critics & audiences praising Raghavan’s direction, film’s dark tone & theme, screenplay & narration, soundtrack, cinematography & performances (especially of Nawazuddin & Dhawan).  Box Office India reported that Badlapur was a commercial success with grossed approximately  worldwide.

On 11 January 2016, the film was nominated for Best Film in the 61st Filmfare Awards, as well as other categories. Till date, the film is considered Varun Dhawan’s performance as his career best.

Plot

Two friends, Liaq (Nawazuddin Siddiqui) and Harman (Vinay Pathak), rob a bank in Pune and steal a car belonging to Misha (Yami Gautam) and her son Robin, forcing them to flee. During the ensuing chase, Robin falls out of the vehicle while Misha gets shot. As per the plan, Harman jumps out of the car and escapes while the police arrest Liaq. Both Misha and Robin succumb to their injuries in a hospital and later die, shattering her husband and his father Raghav "Raghu" Purohit (Varun Dhawan), who violently attacks Liaq in prison before learning through Inspector Govind (Kumud Mishra) that Liaq had a partner. Soon, Raghu approaches a private detective, Mrs. Joshi (Ashwini Kalsekar), who tells him about Liaq's girlfriend and sex worker, Jhimli (Huma Qureshi). Raghu meets and interrogates her and offers all the insurance money he received for his son's death in exchange for telling him Liaq's partner's name, but Jhimli refuses. As a result, an enraged Raghu forces her to dance for him and eventually assaults her. Liaq is convicted for the robbery and sentenced to jail, and Raghu exiles himself to a reclusive life far away from Pune.

Fifteen years later, Liaq becomes terminally ill and wishes to spend his remaining life with his mother. Raghu is approached by a social worker, Shobha (Divya Dutta), who asks him to forgive Liaq, but he declines. However, he has a change of mind when he's told Liaq's partner's name by his mother, Zeenat (Pratima Kazmi), who wants her son to be paroled on compassionate grounds. Liaq is paroled but is followed by a cop secretly so as to be led to Harman, his partner. Raghu locates Harman and gets close to his wife Kanchan "Koko" Khatri (Radhika Apte), who invites him for lunch to their home where Raghu's true intentions are revealed. Harman agrees that he was a participant in the robbery but denies having killed Misha and Robin, and tries to deal with Raghu, who threatens to call the police. Koko begins to plead with him to spare them, in exchange for which Raghu demands her sleeping with him. Harman and Raghu have a fight in which Raghu overpowers the former and proceeds to the bedroom, where he exacts his revenge by making Koko strip and forcing her to scream, in order to make Harman believe they're having sex.

Liaq contacts Harman for his share of money and arranges a meeting. However, Raghu arrives at Harman's house first, where he murders Koko and Harman with a hammer. He then goes to meet Shobha and pretends to be in love with her, creating a perfect alibi. Liaq grows suspicious when the police start investigating Harman's disappearance along with his wife. He is told by Zeenat that she gave Harman's name to Raghu in exchange for Liaq's own freedom. Shobha is enraged to discover that Raghu told the cops they had sex. Raghu arrives at the home, where a fight ensues between him and Liaq, resulting in Raghu beating the latter unconscious. As Liaq wakes up, Raghu explains his entire modus operandi before Liaq reveals himself to be the one who killed Raghu's family out of panic, unlike Raghu, who, Liaq points out, planned his murders with a cool mind and without guilt. He then goes to meet Jhimli, who's now a concubine of a local businessman, Patil (Zakir Hussain), for one last time and tells her he's nearing death. Having circumstantial evidence against Raghu, Govind tries to blackmail him into giving him Liaq's share of the money. However, Liaq walks into the police station and takes the blame for Raghu's crimes, giving him a second chance to live his life and redeeming himself.

After seven months, when Liaq succumbs to cancer in jail, Jhimli meets Raghu and makes him realize the futility of his revenge. She then drives away with Patil in a car, leaving him standing in the rain.

Cast 

 Varun Dhawan as Raghav "Raghu" Purohit 
 Nawazuddin Siddiqui as Liaq Mohammed Tungrekar
 Huma Qureshi as Janki "Jhimli" Dagaonkar, a sex-worker who is Liaq's girlfriend
 Yami Gautam as Misha Senthil Purohit, Raghu's wife  
 Divya Dutta as Shobha
 Vinay Pathak as Harman Khatri
 Radhika Apte as Kanchan "Koko" Khatri
 Ashwini Kalsekar as Mrs. Joshi
 Murali Sharma as Michael Dada
 Pratima Kazmi as Zeenat Mohammed Tungrekar, Liaq's mother
 Zakir Hussain as Shardul Patil, a businessman who later employs Jhimli as a concubine
 Kumud Mishra as Inspector Govind
Neel Tyagi as Robin Purohit, Raghu's son

Production 
The film began shooting in May 2014.

Critical reception
On review aggregation website Rotten Tomatoes, the film has a rating of 92%, based on 8 reviews, with an average rating of 7/10.

Raja Sen from Rediff.com rated it 4 out of 5 and said "Badlapur is a dark, unflinching, fantastic film." Sudhish Kamath from The Hindu wrote that the film was "darkly ambitious and very well made." Rachit Gupta from Filmfare stated that it had "exhilarating performances, stellar storytelling."

Saibal Chatterjee of NDTV rated it 3/5 and noted the pervasive contemptful treatment of women in the film, writing, "If one can ignore the overt misogyny on show all through the film, Badlapur throws up enough surprises to hold the viewer's interest right until the bitter end."

Mohar Basu of The Times of India rated Badlapur 4 out of 5. Shubhra Gupta of The Indian Express rated the movie 2.5 stars out of 5, describing it as riveting, but also noting that the film "comes off too contrived in many places, and leaves us hanging in others." Rajeev Masand and Md Abidur Rahaman of CNN-IBN rated it 3.5 out of 5 and wrote: "The pace slackens post-intermission, plot contrivances are many, and you might say the film is misogynistic in its treatment of women ... [However], the film keeps you on your toes, curious to see where its twists and turns will lead."

In December 2015, Badlapur got 15 nominations at the Stardust Awards, having the maximum number of award nominations from one film for the year. Both Dhawan and Siddiqui were nominated for the Best Actor category. The film was nominated for awards in Story (2), Screenplay (2), Direction, Lyrics (2), Best Playback Singer (Male), Best Choreographer, Music Direction (2), Best Actor (2), Best Supporting Actor (Female) (2).

Box office

By the end of the third weekend, Badlapur grossed . By the end of its third week run, the movie grossed  nett at India box offices, leading Koimoi to estimate the film has taken in double its expenses. Box Office India reported that Badlapur grossed approximately  worldwide.

Soundtrack

The soundtrack and background score of Badlapur is composed entirely by Sachin–Jigar, while the lyrics were written by Dinesh Vijan and Priya Saraiya. The first song, "Jee Karda", was released as a single on 9 December 2014. The song "Jeena Jeena" was released on 14 February 2015. Jeena Jeena reached number one on the Indian iTunes charts, Radio Mirchi charts, and Bollywood Planet charts for several weeks.

Awards and nominations

Further reading

References

External links 
 
 
 

2015 films
2010s Hindi-language films
2015 action thriller films
2015 crime drama films
2015 crime thriller films
2015 crime action films
Films about criminals
Indian films about revenge
Indian action thriller films
Indian crime drama films
Indian crime thriller films
Indian crime action films
Indian action drama films
Films based on Italian novels
Films directed by Sriram Raghavan